The Dictionnaire Historique et Critique (in English, the Historical and Critical Dictionary) was a French biographical dictionary written by Pierre Bayle (1647–1706), a Huguenot who lived and published in Rotterdam, in the Republic of the Seven United Netherlands, after fleeing his native France due to religious persecution. In 1689, Bayle began making notes on errors and omissions in Louis Moreri's Grand Dictionaire historique (1674), a previous encyclopedia, and these notes ultimately developed into his own Dictionnaire.

The first edition of Bayle's dictionary, published in 1697, comprised two volumes, each with two parts, so that it appeared as four physical books (A–B, C–G, H–O, and P–Z). In the second edition of 1702, it was enlarged to three volumes (A–D, E–M, and N–Z). An English translation was first published in 1709.

The overwhelming majority of the entries were devoted to individual people, whether historical or mythical, but some articles treated religious beliefs and philosophies. Many of the more controversial ideas in the book were hidden away in the voluminous footnotes, or they were slipped into articles on seemingly uncontroversial topics.

The rigor and skeptical approach demonstrated in the Dictionary influenced many thinkers of the Enlightenment, including Denis Diderot and the other Encyclopédistes, David Hume, and George Berkeley. Bayle delighted in pointing out contradictions between theological tenets and the supposedly self-evident dictates of reason. He used the evidence of the irrationality of Christianity to emphasize that the basis of Christianity is faith in God and divine revelation. But at the same time he sought to promote religious tolerance, and argued strongly against inflexible and authoritarian application of religious articles of faith.  This led to a bitter argument with his fellow French Protestant Pierre Jurieu.

References

Further reading
 Thomas M. Lennon and Michael Hickson, "Pierre Bayle," The Stanford Encyclopedia of Philosophy (2012) online

External links
16 vol. Beuchot edition (1820) at the Internet Archive (in French):

Vol. 1: AA–AM
Vol. 2: AN–AZ
Vol. 3: BA–BOR
Vol. 4: BOS–CA
Vol. 5: CE–DO
Vol. 6: DR–F
Vol. 7: G–HEM
Vol. 8: HEN–K
Vol. 9: L
Vol. 10: M
Vol. 11: N–PE
Vol. 12: PH–R
Vol. 13: S
Vol. 14: T–X
Vol. 15: Z
Vol. 16: Index

Abridged English translation (Hunt & Clarke, 1826) at Google Books:
Vol. 1: AA–DO
Vol. 2: DR–PA
Vol. 3: PA–WO
Vol 4: WO–Z

1697 books
French dictionaries
Philosophy of religion literature
Modern philosophical literature
Philosophy and thought in the Dutch Republic
17th-century encyclopedias
Historical dictionaries